Muhammad ibn Ali Rawandi (died after 1207), was a Persian historian who wrote the Rahat al-sudur wa ayat al-surur during the fall of the Great Seljuk Empire and the subsequent invasion by the Kharwarzmian empire.

The only source that gives details about Rawandi's life is his own book. He was from a scholarly family from Rawand near Kashan, and studied Hanafi fiqh in Hamadan from 1174 to 1184. As a calligrapher, Rawandi was brought to court to craft a Quran for Toghrul III and gained the sultan's favor. After Toghrul's incarceration, Rawandi gained the patronage of Shihab al-Din al-Kashani, who urged him to write the Rahat al-sudur. Rawandi had intended to dedicate his book to Süleymanshah II, but dedicated it to Kaykhusraw I, following the latter's accession as Sultan of Rum. Later the Rahat al-sudur was translated into Turkish during the reign of Murad II.

Rawandi died after 1207.

Modern era
In 1921, the Rahat al-sudur was published by Muhammad Iqbal (died 1938). It was recognized by Iqbal, Edward G. Browne and Mirza Muhammad Qazwini as a source in other texts, namely Jami' al-tawarikh of Rashid al-Din Hamadani (died 1318), Rawdat al-safa of Mirkhvand (died 1498) and Tarikh-i guzida of Hamdallah Mustawfi (died after 1339/40).

References

Sources 
 
 
 
 
 

12th-century  calligraphers
12th-century Iranian historians
Scholars from the Seljuk Empire
Historians from the Sultanate of Rum
Calligraphers of the medieval Islamic world